Mafinga Central is the highest point in the Mafinga Hills on the border of Zambia and Malawi. At  it is likely to be the highest mountain in Zambia. It is most easily accessed from the town of Chisenga in Malawi.

The peak was climbed in 2014 by an international team from the United Kingdom, Malawi and Lithuania, who measured it to be slightly higher than  Mafinga South, another peak on the watershed close by. A more accurate survey is needed to establish for certain which of the two peaks is higher. Both peaks are found on the Mafinga Ridge, an area composed of quartzites, phyllites, and feldspathic sandstones of sedimentary origin. The Luangwa River, one of Zambia's major river systems, rises in the Mafinga Hills on the western side of the ridge.

References

Geography of Zambia
Geography of Malawi
Malawi–Zambia border
Highest points of countries